Yongfeng (unless otherwise indicated, Chinese: t , s , p Yǒngfēng,  "ever-abundant") may refer to:

SS Zhongshan, ex-Yongfeng, a Chinese gunboat

Locations in China 
Counties (永丰县), also known as Yongfengxian
Yongfeng County, Jiangxi

Towns (永丰镇), also known as Yongfengzhen
Yongfeng, Tianchang, Anhui
Yongfeng, Chongqing, Zhong County, Chongqing
Yongfeng, Gansu, Liangzhou District, Wuwei, Gansu
Yongfeng, Guangdong, Deqing County, Guangdong
Yongfeng, Qinggang County, Qinggang County, Suihua, Heilongjiang
Yongfeng, Shuangfeng, Shuangfeng County, Loudi, Hunan
Yongfeng, Jiangsu, Xinghua, Jiangsu
Yongfeng, Luonan County, Shaanxi
Yongfeng, Weinan, Pucheng County, Shaanxi
Yongfeng, Yunnan, Zhaoyang District, Zhaotong, Yunnan
Yongfeng, Zhejiang in Linhai, Zhejiang

Townships (永丰乡), also known as Yongfengxiang
Yongfeng Township, in Huangshan District, Huangshan City, Anhui
Yongfeng Township, in Xiangcheng City, Henan
Yongfeng Township, Changde, Li County, Hunan
Yongfeng Township, Rucheng County, Hunan
Yongfeng Township, Xingguo County, Jiangxi
Yongfeng Township, Jiuzhaigou County, Sichuan
Yongfeng Township, Shunqing District, Nanchong, Sichuan
Yongfeng Township, Zhongjiang County, Sichuan
Yongfeng Township, Ürümqi County, Xinjiang
Yongfeng Korean Ethnic Township, Chengzihe District, Jixi, Heilongjiang

Subdistricts (永丰街道)
Yongfeng Subdistrict, Guangfeng County, Jiangxi
Yongfeng Subdistrict, Juye County, Shandong
Yongfeng Subdistrict, Shanghai, Songjiang District, Shanghai
Yongfeng Road Subdistrict (永丰路街道), Renqiu, Hebei
Yongfeng Subdistrict, Hanyang District, Wuhan, Hubei

Villages
Yongfeng, Wanquan, Wanquan, Honghu, Jingzhou, Hubei

Islands
Yongfengsha (永丰沙), a former name of an island since merged into Chongming near Shanghai

See also
Yongfeng station (disambiguation)